Arjun: The Warrior Prince is a 2012 Indian animated action film, directed by Arnab Chaudhuri, written by Rajesh Devraj, and produced by Ronnie Screwvala and Siddharth Roy Kapur under UTV Motion Pictures and Walt Disney Pictures. The film was written through Arjun’s point of view, an unsung hero of the Mahabharata. The film was released in India on 25 May 2012. Walt Disney Studios Motion Pictures held a week-long limited engagement on 1 September 2012 at the El Capitan Theater to qualify for Academy Awards consideration. However, the film was not nominated.

Plot
The story is based on the early life of the Prince Arjuna, loosely taken from the ancient Indian epic Mahabharata. The storyline begins with Arjun as a nine-year-old boy, and follows him until he grows into the warrior that the world knows him as. It explores his life with his brothers in Hastinapur, his training and education, and his ultimate discovery of the warrior within himself.

The film begins with Uttar, the young prince of Viratnagar (Kingdom of king Virata), asking a maid (Brihannala) to tell him a story. The maid narrates him the story of Arjun.

She tells him that Arjun was a student of Drona, and that he learned the art of warfare from him. He was more skilled than all the students of Drona. None of his own brothers, nor his cousins - the hundred Kauravas - could equal him in the art. Duryodhana and the other Kauravas despised the Pandavas, for they feared that they might usurp Duryodhana's throne. 
When the king Dhritrashtra grew older, the rivalry between his sons, the Kauravas and the Pandavas intensified. Twice, Duryodhana attempted to kill all the Pandavas, but failed. To avoid further conflict, Dhritrashtra proclaimed Duryodhana as the crown prince of Hastinapur, and asked Yudhishthira to be the king of a distant unkempt territory of the empire.

In the meantime, Arjun won a swayamvar, and married the daughter of the King of Panchala, Draupadi. Duryodhana, who loathed the Pandavas, hatched a conspiracy with his uncle Shakuni and won all that belonged to the Pandavas in a betting game called chaupar. After losing everything, Yudhishthira betted his own brothers and Draupadi, and even himself. Draupadi was insulted in front of everyone, but Arjuna could not say anything because Yudhishthira was the king, and the king's words are the last words. The Pandavas, according to the rules of the game, had to go into exile for twelve years and an agyatavasa for one year.
While all the Pandavas go one way, Arjuna travels North to do tapasya. Before leaving, Draupadi makes him promise that he will take revenge for her insult. He then leaves, and does tapasya, during which he earns a bow from the Lord Shiva.

The story then shifts back to the present day Viratnagar. It is revealed that the Pandavas are spending their secret exile, or 'agyatavasa', there, and are noticed by some of the spies of Duryodhana. According to the outcome of the game, if any one of the Pandavas is found before the end of that one year, the Pandavas will have to again go for a twelve-year exile. 
The spy informs Duryodhana that the Pandavas are in Viratnagar. So he launches an attack on Viratnagar with the help of his bandit friends. The king of Viratnagar leaves to thrash the marauding bandits. However, that is the bait. From the other direction, Duryodhana's army comes, and it seems that the young prince of Viratnagar is the only one who is left to fight.

Uttar's maid drives the young prince's chariot to the field, but the prince, distraught by the number of enemies, flees. The maid stops him, and reveals her true identity: the maid (Brihannala) comes out as Arjun. Arjun retrieves his bow and makes prince Uttar drive his chariot. The warrior massacres the army and emerges victorious, and at last, Arjuna alone defeats all Kaurava warriors, including Bhisma and Drona.

Cast
 Yuddvir Bakolia as Arjun
 Aanjjan Srivastav as Kirat/Lord Shiva
 Sachin Khedekar as Lord Krishna
 Rajeshwari Sachdev as Draupadi
 Ashok Banthia as Bheem
 Ravi Khanwilkar as Drona
 Hemant Mahaur as Duryodhan
 Brijesh Jha as Yudhishthir
 Vijay Kashyap as Shakuni
 Ila Arun as Kunti
 Vishnu Sharma as Bheeshma

Critical reception

India

Manjula from Deccan Herald reviewed the film saying that, "Animator-turned-filmmaker Arnab Chaudhuri's debut seeks to highlight Arjun\s life that the common man may not be familiar with. [The Mahabharata t]old from Arjun's perspective and in flashback mostly, the story retains the tension and suspense that any film needs to sustain itself.” “Priyanka Ketkar of Koimoi gave the movie 4 stars out of 5, saying that "Arjun: The Warrior Prince is an extremely engaging movie with fabulous animation". Martin D'Souza of Glamsham gave the movie 4 stars out of 5, commenting that "If your Sunday mornings were spent in front of the television set two decades ago, this one is definitely for you". Madhureeta Mukherjee of The Times of India gave the movie 3.5 stars out of 5, concluding that "Of all the amateurish animation films we've seen, this one's a 'God-send'".

Mansha Rastogi of Now Running gave the movie 3 stars out of 5, saying that "Arjun has all the right ingredients to attract its target mass and also a crackling animation work to entice them into his world!". Rajeev Masand of CNN-IBN gave the movie 3 stars out of 5, concluding that "I'm going to with three out of five for Arjun: The Warrior Prince. Like its hero, the film too is a valiant effort, and an interesting interpretation of a much-loved mythological story. Worth a watch". Preeti Arora of Rediff gave the movie 3 stars out of 5, saying that "Being an animated film, Arjun is sure to find a connect with children."It is also a great outing for someone who wishes to walk down nostalgia lane with their favourite tales of the good old days". Ananya Bhattacharya of Zee News gave the movie 3 stars out of 5, concluding that "No form of popular culture can ever encompass the greatness of the man called Arjun. Watch ‘Arjun’ for yet another perspective on him. Watch ‘Arjun’ if you are craving that much-needed break from the current films of the day, which have pushed you to the brink of insanity. Watch ‘Arjun’ to see the man who is synonymous with the Mahabharata!".

Taran Adarsh of Bollywood Hungama gave the movie 3 stars out of 5, saying "On the whole, Arjun: The Warrior Prince needs to be watched for its animation, for its storytelling and most importantly, it makes an earnest effort to relive the mythology." Aakanksha Naval-Shetye and Chaya Unnikrishnan of DNA India gave the movie 3 stars out of 5, saying that "Director Arnab Chaudhari has kept the narrative fast paced. A nice way of introducing kids to the epic tale". Anupama Chopra of Hindustan Times gave the movie 3 stars out of 5, concluding that Arjun: The Warrior Prince is a step forward for Indian animation. I only wish the storytelling itself had been more animated". The Hindu gives it a 4, and says "A world class show with a good old Indian touch". Suparna Sharma of the Deccan Chronicle gives it 4 stars out of 5, and says "I really hope there will be a part two of Arjun because this story is really worth telling and Arnab Chaudhuri and his team tell it really well".

International

 Lou Lumenick of New York Post in his negative review of the film, wrote: "Even though the title character vaguely resembles Disney's Tarzan, nobody is going to mistake the less-than-state-of-the-art, computer-game-style 2-D animation for the work of the American parent, much less its Pixar subsidiary". Robert Abele of Los Angeles Times gave the film 3 out of 5 stars stating "The animation is at times stiff and presentational, like a rushed rotoscoping job, but there's a charming majesty to the enterprise". The film got positive response at Annecy International Animated Film Festival, where it was nominated for Cristal Award the top prize of the festival.

Accolades

Soundtrack

Distributed and released by Walt Disney Records and UTV Music, the soundtrack of Arjun: The Warrior Prince is composed by Vishal-Shekhar with lyrics by Piyush Mishra, while Dhruv Ghanekar composed the background score.

See also

List of Indian animated feature films
 List of Disney theatrical animated features
 List of Walt Disney Pictures films

References

External links

Arjun: The Warrior Prince at D23.com

2010s Hindi-language films
2012 films
2012 animated films
Animated action films
Indian animated films
Indian action war films
Films scored by Vishal–Shekhar
Walt Disney Pictures animated films
UTV Motion Pictures films
Animated films based on Mahabharata
Disney India films
Kalarippayattu films
2010s action war films
Indian martial arts films
2012 martial arts films